Prasocuris is a genus of Chrysomelinae (a subfamily of leaf beetles).

Species
These species belong to the genus Prasocuris:
 Prasocuris boreella (Schaeffer, 1928)
 Prasocuris junci Brahm, 1790
 Prasocuris obliquata J. L. LeConte, 1866
 Prasocuris ovalis Blatchley, 1910
 Prasocuris phellandrii (Linnaeus, 1758)
 Prasocuris vittata (Olivier, 1807)

References

Further reading

External links

 
 

Chrysomelinae
Chrysomelidae genera
Taxa named by Pierre André Latreille